The Tug of War International Federation (TWIF) is the international governing body for the sport of tug of war.

Member countries 
Due to national organization and historical rivalry, certain countries are listed below as individuals, rather than as members of a larger political union. For example, the Home Countries compete as separate nations, and the Basque Country has its own team.

Competitions
TWIF organizes world championships for national teams, U23 and club competetition. Those are:
 TWIF Outdoor World Championships (biennially, even years)
 TWIF Indoor World Championships (biennially, odd years)
 TWIF Outdoor Clubs Championships
 TWIF Indoor Clubs Championships
 TWIF Outdoor Junior Championships
 TWIF Indoor Junior Championships
 TWIF Outdoor U23 Championships
 TWIF Indoor U23 Championships

See also 

 Tug of war at the Summer Olympics
 Tug of war at the World Games
 Association of IOC Recognised International Sports Federations

References

External links 
 

IOC-recognised international federations
Organizations based in Wisconsin
Sports in Wisconsin
International Federation